Shashaa Kiran Tirupati (born 21 December 1989) is a Canadian playback singer, songwriter, and music producer of Indian descent. Popularly known as "The Humma Girl", in 2018, she won the National Film Award for Best Female Playback Singer, as well as the Filmfare Award for the Tamil song "Vaan Varuvaan" from Kaatru Veliyidai. Tirupati has recorded songs in over 20+ languages including: Tamil, Telugu, Marathi, Punjabi, Malayalam, Kannada, Bengali, Konkani, Arabic, and English with more than 200 songs to her credit as a vocalist.

She is the voice behind Bollywood hits such as: "Khulke Jeene Ka" (Dil Bechara), "The Humma Song", from OK Jaanu; "Phir Bhi Tumko Chahunga" (with Arijit Singh) and "Baarish" for Half Girlfriend; "Kanha", for Shubh Mangal Savdhan; "O Sona Tere Liye" and "Chal Kahin Door", both from the film Mom. She features on the soundtrack of 'Mimi' (2021) starring Kriti Sanon and Pankaj Tripathi in the song titled 'Hututu', composed by AR Rahman and penned by Amitabh Bhattacharya.

Tirupati released her first single, 'In My Skin' from her debut Independent EP (I'm Sorry, Heart) featuring celebrated guitarist, Keba Jeremiah in January, 2022.

Early life 

She attended LA Matheson Secondary School in Surrey, British Columbia, Canada. She graduated in 2005, with a 96% average, earning a Gordon M. Shrum Major Entrance Scholarship for Undergraduate Studies at Simon Fraser University, the Matheson Outstanding Academic Achievement Award, The Surrey Administrator's Scholarship, The UBC President's Entrance Scholarship, and the Governor General's Medallion for the top-most achiever of the province's graduating class of 2005.

Career 
While pursuing her under-graduate studies, Tirupati continued to perform at festivals and solo concerts. She later left school to pursue a career in Bollywood, playback singing in Mumbai. She plays kazoo (African instrument), western classical guitar, keyboards, and harmonium.

Tirupati was noticed by A. R. Rahman during Coke Studio Season 3, shortly after which she sang a solo for him, "Vaada Vaada", in Kochadaiiyaan. Her second song, "Aye Mr. Minor", from Rahman's musical, Kaaviyathalaivan, gained immediate recognition in the Tamil music industry, followed by "Naane Varugiren", "Vaan", "Silikku Marame", "Oday Oday", "Kaara Aatakaara", "Un Kadhal Irundhaal", "Thaen Kaatru", "Uyiraagi", "Kaadhalaada" and the recent "Naan Pizhai" for Anirudh Ravichander.

She was featured on three tracks in the 2015 Mani Ratnam - A. R. Rahman film OK Kanmani: "Kaara Attaakaara", "Parandhu Sella Vaa", and "Naane Varugiren", as well as on the corresponding three songs in the Telugu version, OK Bangaram.

She has recently featured on the soundtrack of AR Rahman's "Dil Bechara", starring Sushant Singh Rajput and Sanjana Sanghi. The song, titled "Khulke Jeene Ka", features Tirupati and Arijit Singh. She has rendered two songs on the AR Rahman directorial "99 Songs" soundtrack, namely, "Soja Soja" (solo lead) and "Humnawaa" (with Armaan Mallik), which she has co-written as lyricist as well. Her recent Telugu song, "Manasu Maree", for actor Nani's film "V" with Amit Trivedi, also the composer of the film, has been much appreciated.

She toured extensively with A.R Rahman in: Encore Tour 2017, Infinite Love Tour, Rahmanishq Tour, T 20 Opening Concert, Greatest Hits Concert at the O2, Vadodara Festival, NH7 Weekender, TEDx Talks, and ENCORE 2017). She has sung more than 30 songs (in different languages) for him. Tirupati has performed at Men's Hockey World Cup Opening Ceremony as part of AR Rahman's Entourage.  She was part of MTV Unplugged Season 4, alongside Hindi music director Mithoon. Tirupati performed at the BRICS SUMMIT in Goa with Clinton Cerejo. She is currently venturing into Independent Music, and releasing original content written and sung by herself. "String of Air" is her first independently released single.

Tirupati has rendered songs in over 13 languages, with more than 200 songs to her credit as a vocalist. She is also collaborating with playback singer, Chinmayi Sripada, for her fifth original composition, to be a bilingual track, titled "Yezhundhu Via" in Tamil and "Roothi Hui" in Hindi. The song was released Tirupati's YouTube Channel in January 2020. Tirupati made her theatre acting debut with the play I, Cloud, written and directed by Ulka Mayur, with lyricist Mayur Puri playing the male lead.

Recognition 
Tirupati is the recipient of the National Award 2018 for Best Female Singer for the song "Vaan Varuvaan" (Kaatru Veliyidai). She has won the Filmfare Award for "Vaan Varuvaan", and the Star Screen Award for Best Playback Singer (Female) for the song "Kanha" (Shubh Mangal Savdhan), the Mirchi Music Award for Sunn Bhanwara (OK Jaanu), and was nominated for Best Playback Singer (Female) at the Jio Filmfare Awards for Kanha. She received the Jubilee Awards 2017 Platinum and Gold Discs, the Zee Cine Award 2018 for Viewer's Choice Song of the Year (Baarish), the Mirchi Music Award 2015 for Best Upcoming Female Singer for the song "Aye Mr. Minor" composed by A. R. Rahman and Vikatan Awards 2015 for Best Upcoming Female Singer for the song "Naane Varugiren", also composed by A. R. Rahman.

Popularly known as "The Humma Girl", in 2018, she won the National Film Award for Best Female Playback Singer, as well as the Filmfare Award, for the Tamil song "Vaan Varuvaan", from Kaatru Veliyidai.

Independent music

Discography

Awards and nominations

References

External links 

Living people
1989 births
Canadian people of Indian descent
Canadian people of Kashmiri descent
Canadian Hindus
People from Srinagar
Kashmiri people
Kashmiri Pandits
Indian emigrants to Canada
Musicians from Vancouver
Canadian musicians of Indian descent
Simon Fraser University alumni
Canadian playback singers
Canadian women singer-songwriters
Tamil playback singers
Telugu playback singers
Kannada playback singers
Malayalam playback singers
Marathi playback singers
Bollywood playback singers
Expatriate musicians in India
Canadian expatriates in India
Screen Awards winners
Best Female Playback Singer National Film Award winners
21st-century Canadian singers
21st-century Canadian women singers